dollarDEX, founded in 1998 in Singapore, is one of the earliest financial supermarkets in Asia.  It offers clients a selection of products—loans, insurance, investments (unit trusts/mutual funds, alternative investment vehicles), financial advice—sourced from banks, insurance companies, and fund managers around the world.

References 
 Stijn Claessens, Thomas Glaessner, and Daniela Klingebiel, "Electronic Finance: Reshaping the Financial Landscape Around the World," World Bank, Financial Sector Discussion Paper No. 4
 E-Finance in Emerging Markets: Is Leapfrogging Possible? New York University Stern School, Salomon Center Working Paper, February 2002
 María J Nieto, "Reflections on the regulatory approach to e-finance" Bank of International Settlements
 UNCTAD Expert Meeting, "E-Finance And Small And Medium-Size Enterprises (SMEs) In Developing And Transition Economies" United Nations Conference On Trade And Development, 2001
 Trade Finance Infrastructure Development Handbook for Economies in Transition United Nations Economic And Social Commission for Asia and the Pacific

Financial services companies established in 1998
Financial services companies of Singapore
Singaporean companies established in 1998